Michal Petráň (born 26 June 1992) is a professional Czech football player who plays for Viktoria Žižkov.

References

Czech footballers
1992 births
Living people
Czech First League players
Czech National Football League players
SK Dynamo České Budějovice players
FK Pardubice players
MFK Karviná players
Association football forwards
FK Fotbal Třinec players
Sportspeople from Pardubice
FK Viktoria Žižkov players
Bohemian Football League players